The Heligoland–Zanzibar Treaty (also known as the Anglo-German Agreement of 1890) was an agreement signed on 1 July 1890 between the German Empire and the United Kingdom. 

The accord gave Germany control of the Caprivi Strip (a ribbon of land that gave German South-West Africa access to the Zambezi River), the strategically located island of Heligoland in the North Sea, and the heartland of German East Africa. In return, Germany recognized British authority in Zanzibar. Heligoland was needed to control the new Kiel Canal and the approaches to Germany's North Sea ports. Britain used Zanzibar as a key link in the British control of East Africa.

Terms

Germany gained the islands of Heligoland in the North Sea, originally possession of the dukes of Holstein-Gottorp but since 1814 a British possession, the so-called Caprivi Strip in what is now Namibia, and a free hand to control and acquire the coast of Dar es Salaam that would form the core of German East Africa (later Tanganyika, now the mainland component of Tanzania).

In exchange, Germany handed over to Britain the protectorate over the small sultanate of Wituland (on the Kenyan coast) and parts of East Africa vital for the British to build a railway to Lake Victoria, and pledged not to interfere with British actions vis-à-vis the independent Sultanate of Zanzibar (i.e. the islands of Unguja and Pemba). In addition, the treaty established the German sphere of interest in German South West Africa (most of present-day Namibia) and settled the borders between German Togoland and the British Gold Coast (now Ghana), as well as between German Kamerun and British Nigeria.

Consequences
Britain divested itself of a naval base which covered the approaches to the main German naval bases in the North Sea, but which would be impossible to defend as Germany built up its navy.  It immediately declared a protectorate over Zanzibar and, in the subsequent 1896 Anglo-Zanzibar War, gained full control of the sultanate.

The treaty served German chancellor Leo von Caprivi's aims for settlement with the British. After the 1884 Berlin Conference, Germany had lost in this phase of the "Scramble for Africa": the German East Africa Company under Carl Peters had acquired a strip of land on the Tanganyikan coast (leading to the 1888 Abushiri Revolt), but had never had any control over the islands of the Zanzibar sultanate; the Germans gave away no vital interest. In return, they acquired Heligoland, strategically placed for control over the German Bight, which, with the construction of the Kiel Canal from 1887 onward, had become essential to Emperor Wilhelm's II plans for expansion of the Imperial Navy. Wilhelm's naval policies aborted an accommodation with the British and ultimately led to a rapprochement between Britain and France, sealed with the Entente cordiale in 1904.

The misleading name for the treaty was introduced by ex-Chancellor Otto von Bismarck, who intended to attack his despised successor Caprivi for concluding an agreement that Bismarck himself had arranged during his incumbency. However, Bismarck's nomenclature implied that Germany had swapped an African empire for tiny Heligoland ("trousers for a button"). This was eagerly adopted by imperialists, who complained about "treason" against German interests.

Notes

Further reading
 
 
 
 
 
  Includes the citation of the English version of the contract.

External links

Vertrag zwischen dem Deutschen Reich und dem Vereinigten Königreich über die Kolonien und Helgoland vom 1. Juli 1890, Deutsche Geschichte in Dokumenten und Bildern (DGDB), Transcription of: Das Staatsarchiv. Sammlung der offiziellen Aktenstücke zur Geschichte der Gegenwart, Bd. 51, Duncker & Humblot, Leipzig 1891, S. 151. 
The Anglo-German Treaty (Heligoland–Zanzibar Treaty) 1 July 1890, Translation of the German version of the contract

History of Zanzibar
Legal history of German East Africa
British colonisation in Africa
German South West Africa
Treaty
Treaties of the United Kingdom (1801–1922)
Treaties concluded in 1890
1890 in the United Kingdom
1890 in Germany
1890 in Zanzibar
Germany–United Kingdom relations
19th century in Africa
Treaties of the German Empire
Treaties entered into force in 1890
Treaties extended to the Sultanate of Zanzibar
British Heligoland
Bilateral treaties of the United Kingdom